Bowen-Apollo is a feature on Earth's Moon, a crater in Taurus-Littrow valley, located at the foot of the Sculptured Hills.  Astronauts Eugene Cernan and Harrison Schmitt landed to the southwest of it in 1972, on the Apollo 17 mission. They referred to it simply as Bowen during the mission.  It is located just east of Geology Station 8.

To the southwest of Bowen are Cochise, Van Serg, and Shakespeare.  To the west is Henry.

The crater was named by the astronauts after geologist Norman L. Bowen, originator of Bowen's reaction series.

References

External links
43D1S2(25) Apollo 17 Traverses at Lunar and Planetary Institute
Geological Investigation of the Taurus-Littrow Valley: Apollo 17 Landing Site

Impact craters on the Moon
Apollo 17